Hunfrith is an Anglo-Saxon given name

 Hunfrith Bishop of Elmham
 Hunfrith of Winchester (d. c. 752) Bishop of Winchester